Agustín Olguera (1906–1942) was a Spanish painter.  He studied painting at the School of Painting and Sculpture at the Royal Academy of Fine Arts of San Fernando in Madrid, sharing a classroom with Salvador Dalí.

In 1930, achieved a 600 pesetas monthly scholarship from the Board for Advanced Studies Abroad, with subsequent extensions, allowing him to study painting in Paris from 1930 to 1936.

1906 births
1942 deaths
20th-century Spanish painters
20th-century Spanish male artists
Spanish male painters